Leicestershire County Cricket Club was officially founded on 25 March 1879. Leicestershire's team was elevated to first-class status in 1894 and the club joined the County Championship in 1895. It is one of eighteen county teams in England and Wales that play first-class cricket. The player appointed club captain leads the team in all fixtures except if unavailable.

 Charles de Trafford (1894–1906)
 Arthur Hazlerigg senior (1907–1910)
 John Shields (1911–1913)
 Cecil Wood (1914, 1919–1920)
 Aubrey Sharp (1921)
 Gustavus Fowke (1922–1927)
 Eddie Dawson (1928–1929, 1931, 1933)
 John de Lisle (1930)
 Charles Packe (1932)
 Arthur Hazlerigg junior (1934)
 Ewart Astill (1935)
 Stewie Dempster (1936–1938)
 Michael Packe (1939)
 Les Berry (1946–1948)
 Stuart Symington (1949)
 Charles Palmer (1950–1957)
 Willie Watson (1958–1961)
 David Kirby (1962)
 Maurice Hallam (1963–1965, 1968)
 Tony Lock (1966–1967)
 Ray Illingworth (1969–1978)
 Ken Higgs (1979)
 Brian Davison (1980)
 Roger Tolchard (1981–1983)
 David Gower (1984–1986, 1988–1989)
 Peter Willey (1987)
 Nigel Briers (1990–1995)
 James Whitaker (1996–1999)
 Vince Wells (1999–2002)
 Phillip DeFreitas (2003–2004)
 Hylton Ackerman (2005)
 Jeremy Snape (2006–2007)
 Paul Nixon (2007–2010)
 Matthew Hoggard (2010–2012)
 Ramnaresh Sarwan (2013–2014)
 Mark Cosgrove (2015–2017)
 Michael Carberry (2018)
 Paul Horton (2018–2019)
 Colin Ackermann (2020-2022)
 Callum Parkinson (2022)
 Lewis Hill (2023 to date)

See also
 List of Leicestershire CCC players

Notes

cricket
Lists of English cricketers
Leicestershire County Cricket Club
Leicstershire